David Stuart Rubin (born June 18, 1949) is an American curator, art critic, and artist.

Early life and education 
Rubin was born in Los Angeles. He earned a Bachelor of Arts degree in philosophy from the University of California, Los Angeles and a Master of Arts in history from Harvard University.

Career 
As a contemporary art curator, Rubin is recognized for thematic exhibitions such as "Old Glory: The American Flag in Contemporary Art,"  "It's Only Rock and Roll: Rock and Roll Currents in Contemporary Art," and "Psychedelic: Optical and Visionary Art since the 1960s." 

Rubin has held curatorial positions at Scripps College, Pomona College, Santa Monica College, the San Francisco Art Institute, San Francisco Museum of Modern Art, Albright College, the Museum of Contemporary Art Cleveland, Phoenix Art Museum, Contemporary Arts Center, and San Antonio Museum of Art. In 1996, Rubin served as the U.S. Commissioner for the Cuenca Bienal of Painting. Rubin has organized solo exhibitions for Martha Alf, Robert Arneson, William Baziotes, Willie Birch, Douglas Bourgeois, Ellen Brooks, Peter Campus, Cynthia Carlson, Petah Coyne, Salvador Dalí, Jay DeFeo, Tomer Ganihar, Allen Ginsberg, David Halliday, Wally Hedrick, Al Held, Mark Kostabi, Donald Lipski, Christian Marclay, Ana Mendieta, Dennis Oppenheim, Martin Puryear, Alison Saar, Robert Stackhouse, Vincent Valdez, Carrie Mae Weems, and Emerson Woelffer. 
Rubin's curatorial archives are housed in the Archives of American Art. As an art critic, Rubin has written for Arts Magazine, Art in America, Fabrik, and other art journals. 

He has published numerous books and catalogs in conjunction with exhibitions. As an artist, Rubin is known for automatic drawing. His drawings have been exhibited at Blue Star Contemporary Art Museum, the Bradbury Art Museum at Arkansas State University, and California State University, Northridge. His drawings are in the permanent collections of the Ogden Museum of Southern Art and the Bradbury Art Museum at Arkansas State University.

References

External links 
 David S. Rubin Artist Conversations at the San Antonio Museum of Art
 "The David S. Rubin Papers" at Archives of American Art
 Pecha Kucha presentation
 "David S. Rubin: Drawing as Daily Ritual"

1949 births
Living people
American art curators
American art critics
American artists
Harvard University alumni
University of California, Los Angeles alumni